The Chursächsische Capelle Leipzig is a chamber orchestra founded in Saxony in 1994 by Anne Schumann.

History 
The Chursächsische Capelle Leipzig was founded in 1994 from members of the Gewandhausorchester, the Händelfestspielorchester Halle (Saale) and freelance musicians.

The musical ensemble plays on original instruments and is dedicated to musical compositions of the 17th and 18th centuries. In the style of the old Hofkapellen, the ensemble changes instrumentation depending on the programme.

The Capelle's main venue is Schönefeld Palace in Leipzig, where it can be heard at the Schönefelder Schlosskonzerte, among other events.

In 1996, the Chursächsische Capelle Leipzig recorded a CD chamber music of the Bach family with Ludger Rémy; in the meantime, further CD recordings are on the market.

Recording (selection) 
 Bach family: Kammermusik der Bach-Familie (Raumklang, 1996)
 Mitteldeutsche Barock-cantatas – Kantaten aus der Thüringer Musiksammlung Großfahner. (CPO, 2003)
 Sämtliche Werke für Nagelgeige. (Beoton, 2003)
 Johann Friedrich Fasch: Konzert am Hof zu Principality of Anhalt-Zerbst (Konzertmitschnitt zu den 10. Internationalen Faschfesttagen 2008)

References

External links 
 
 
 

Early music orchestras
Chamber orchestras
1994 establishments in Germany
Music in Leipzig